Adi Pratama (born 11 May 1990) is an Indonesian born Austrian badminton player. In December 2013, he became an assistant coach of Austrian Badminton Association (Österreichischer Badminton Verband) for the men's singles.

Achievements

BWF International Challenge/Series 
Men's singles

  BWF International Challenge tournament
  BWF International Series tournament
  BWF Future Series tournament

References

External links 

 

Living people
1990 births
Sportspeople from Jakarta
Indonesian male badminton players
Badminton coaches
Indonesian expatriate sportspeople in Austria
Austrian male badminton players